Gennady Matveyevich Fadeyev (Russian: Геннадий Матвеевич Фадеев; born in 10 April 1937) is a Russian statesman, who is currently the Advisor to the General Director of Russian Railways since 2015.

Fadeyev was the first president of Russian Railways from 2003 to 2005, and was the Minister of Railways from 1992 to 1996, and again from 2002 to 2003.

He is a Full Cavalier of the Order of Merit for the Fatherland, and an Honored Transport Worker of Russia, awarded in 2009.

The main milestones of Fadeyev's activity at the head of the Russian railway industry, were the preservation of the Ministry of Railways during the period of privatization of state property in the early 1990s, as the creation of the Council for Railway Transport of the Member States of the Commonwealth of the CIS and the Baltic States with a permanent directorate, after the collapse of the Soviet Union. The opening of train traffic throughout the BAM, with completion of full electrification of the Trans-Siberian Railway and the main route to China; construction of the 2nd railway bridge across the Amur River near Khabarovsk; construction of a railway bypass of Krasnoyarsk with a bridge across the Yenisei River. Organization of production in Russia of its own electric trains at the Demikhov Machine-Building Plant; creation of a joint venture for the production of heavy track equipment with the Austrian company Plasser and Theurer; creation and implementation at Moscow railway stations, and then throughout the country, of a new technology for passing passengers through turnstiles using smart cards; launch of the first interregional express trains to Ryazan, Tula, Oryol, Yaroslavl, Vladimir, which opened in 2002, becoming of Russia's first Aeroexpress route to Domodedovo airport from Paveletsky railway station, and then from Kievsky railway station to Vnukovo airport; the return of the historical appearance of the Yasnaya Polyana station near the Leo Tolstoy Museum, the commissioning of the new international Ladoga railway station in St. Petersburg, the decision to remake and start the transition from a narrow gauge to a wide (domestic) one on Sakhalin Island.

Fadeyev is the last head of the Russian railway department, having a specialized education and a basic profession of a railway worker. He was replaced as the head of Russian Railways by an intelligence diplomat and an economist.

Biography

Gennady Fadeyev was born on 10 April 1937, in Shimanovsk, Amur Oblast, to his father, Matvey Yakovlevich, and his mother, Yekaterina Ivanovna.

Matvey worked at the Shimanovskaya station (Amur Railway), in a locomotive depot on the outfit of steam locomotives.

Gennady is the youngest of 7 children in the family.

He studied at the departmental school of the Ministry of Railways No. 59, finished 10 classes. Already in his school years, Gennady constantly spent time with older relatives on the railway, gradually immersed himself in the railway environment, mastered the basics and technical subtleties of the profession of a railway worker; in particular, he knew what “bush rot of sleepers” is and how it affects the safety of train traffic. After receiving the certificate, he went to Vladivostok to enter the Higher Naval School, however, when he saw the ocean for the first time, he realized that “nautical business is not mine” and resolutely chose the profession of a railway worker. At the entrance exams of the operational faculty of the Railway Engineering Institute in Khabarovsk, Fadeyev received 24 points out of 25 possible (the passing score at Moscow State University that year was 23).

In 1961, he graduated with honours from the Khabarovsk Institute of Railway Engineers and was sent to the East Siberian Railway.

Career

In his student years, after the 2nd year, he worked as a duty officer at the Shimanovskaya second-class station, which then passed about 30 pairs of trains a day. After the 3rd year, Fadeyev worked as a train dispatcher at the Skovorodino station. After the 4th year, he worked at the out-of-class station Irkutsk-Sortirovochny. In order to have more time to do practical work at the station, Fadeyev passed all sessions at the institute ahead of schedule. With that, already in his student years, he mastered the work of basic professions in traffic control. The acquired skills allowed Fadeyev, two years after graduation from the institute, to become the chief engineer of the Taishet large railway junction.

From 1961 to 1962, after graduating from the institute, he was on duty on the tracks, as shunting dispatcher, on duty at the Taishet station, Irkutsk Oblast.

From 1962 to 1963, he was a senior assistant to the head of the Taishet station of the East Siberian Railway.

From 1963 to 1965, he was promoted to the chief engineer of the Taishet station.

In 1965 to 1969, he became the Deputy Head of the Department of Traffic and Passenger Work of the Nizhneudinsk Branch of the East Siberian Railway, Nizhneudinsk, Irkutsk Oblast.

From 1969 to 1970, he was promoted as the head of the traffic and passenger work department of the Nizhneudinsk branch of the East Siberian Railway.

From 1970 to 1974, he was the head of the Nizhneudinsk branch of the East Siberian Railway. Under his leadership, the department won the banner of the Ministry of Railways and the Central Committee of the branch trade union for 4 years in a row. From this position, Fadeyev was invited to party work, but he chose the railway. Under his leadership, unscheduled, at the expense of funds raised, a new beautiful railway station was built in Nizhneudinsk.

From 1970 to 1975, he was elected as a deputy of the Nizhneudinsk City Council of Workers' Deputies from constituency No. 80. City of Nizhneudinsk in Irkutsk Region.

From 1974 to 1975, he was the head of the Taishet branch of the East Siberian Railway, in Taishet.

From 1975 to 1977, he became the head of the Krasnoyarsk branch of the East Siberian Railway, in Krasnoyarsk. At the same time, he was elected as a deputy of the Krasnoyarsk Regional Council of Working People's Deputies from constituency No. 197, in Krasnoyarsk.

From 1977 to 1979, he was the First Deputy Head of the East Siberian Railway, in Irkutsk.

From 1979 to 1984, he was the Head of the Krasnoyarsk Railway, in Krasnoyarsk.

Between March 1984 and August 1987, he was the head of the Oktyabrskaya Railway, in Leningrad. In February 1985, he was elected as a deputy of the Supreme Soviet of the RSFSR in the Frunze constituency No. 131, in Leningrad.

From August 1987 to 1988, he was the Deputy Minister, the Head of the Main Traffic Directorate, and the member of the Board of the Ministry of Railways of the Soviet Union.

In 1988, Fadeyev was promoted to the First Deputy Minister of Railways. As the First Deputy Minister of Railways, that year was marked by the highest rise in the Soviet railway industry. That year, about 1,100,000 freight cars ran on the railways of the Soviet Union, and a historically record, hitherto unsurpassed volume of cargo was transported - 4,100,000,000 tons. Such volumes of cargo transportation are more than 3 times higher than in Russia in 2018 (about 1.3 billion tons of cargo), while there are more than 1 million freight cars on the Russian Railways network. The management of cargo transportation in the Soviet Union was carried out by the balance method, the levers for managing the transportation process were in the hands of the heads of the railways, who were independent enterprises, and not branches of the ministry.

In 1990, he was a People's Deputy of the RSFSR for the Krasnoyarsk constituency No. 19, based in Krasnoyarsk.

Minister of Railways

On 20 January 1992, Fadeyev became the Minister of Railways of Russia. Shortly after 54-year-old Fadeyev's appointment to the post of Ministry of Railways, with his efforts, an agreement was reached after the collapse of the Soviet Union not to break the single railway space with a gauge of 1520 mm. The Council for Railway Transport of the Commonwealth and Baltic states was created, which made it possible to maintain the unity of railways and transportation work throughout the post-Soviet space. On 22 January 1993, the Agreement of Heads of Government on the division of the inventory fleet of freight cars and containers of the former USSR Ministry of Railways between the CIS and Baltic countries, was developed with Fadeyev's key participation, which was signed in Minsk. The Council for Railway Transport developed principles for the formation of a unified tariff policy for the carriage of goods in interstate traffic. In February 1993, on the basis of these principles, the Tariff Agreement for Railway Carriers of the CIS Countries was signed, which made it possible to conclude long-term contracts for the carriage of goods in international traffic.

On Fadeyev's initiative and with the direct participation, federal programs for the technical re-equipment of railway transport were developed and implemented. At the Demikhov Machine-Building Plant, the production of modern Russian electric trains has been mastered in the shortest possible time. In Kolomna, the production of promising mainline passenger diesel locomotives and electric locomotives has been developed and mastered, and passenger cars have been developed at the Tver Carriage Building Plant. At Uralvagonzavod, the production of innovative freight cars has been significantly increased.

In August 1996, after the reelection of the President of  Russia, Boris Yeltsin and the formation of a new government, Fadeyev left the post as minister, and was elected Secretary General of the International Coordinating Council for Trans-Siberian Transportation.

In the second half of the 1990s, the profitability of railway transportation of the Ministry of Railways fell to negative values, the bureaucratization of the ministry itself under Minister Nikolay Aksyonenko was publicly criticized, which became an occasion for reforms. The corporate budget of the Ministry of Railways, the irrationality of spending funds surprised Fadeyev, who, having taken up the post for the second time in January 2002, admitted in the press: “We have far-fetched structures with high salaries.” This sensational phrase spread all over Russia, causing amazement even among experienced apparatchiks in the Government of the Russian Federation.".

The first concept of the reform (“The Concept of the Structural Reform of the Federal Railway Transport”), formulated by the ministry itself in 1998, under Aksyonenko, was criticized: as it provided for the creation of a joint-stock company Russian Railways under the auspices of the ministry and did not promise the denationalization of the industry. As a result, the program for reforming the Russian railway industry was developed under Fadeyev's leadership with the involvement of private consultants. The Accounts Chamber and the Prosecutor General's Office of Russia carried out large-scale inspections that revealed serious violations in the previous activities of the ministry, which resulted in a criminal case against the former Minister Aksyonenko.

Head of the Moscow Railway

On 3 March 1999, Fadeyev was appointed head of the Moscow Railway, a member of the collegium of the Ministry of Railways.

As head of the Moscow Railway, Fadeyev developed accelerated and intermodal passenger transportation. Under his leadership, the Sputnik luxury trains began to run, an accelerated connection was opened by regional multi-unit express trains with conductors in cars to Tula, Oryol, Ryazan, Yaroslavl, Vladimir and then to other regional cities. In the years when ticketless and preferential travel reached its apogee, with 105 categories of beneficiaries on the Moscow Railway, Fadeyev initiated the appearance of the first turnstiles at Kievsky and Rizhsky stations, which increased ticket revenues in these directions.

He was a confidant of Vladimir Putin, as he was a registered candidate for the President of the Russia on 24 February 2000.

In 2001, Fadeyev, as head of the Moscow Railway, argued with Moscow Mayor Yury Luzhkov about the prospects for passenger traffic along the Small Ring. The project proposed by Luzhkov did not provide for a large-scale reconstruction and electrification of the entire ring, but meant the launch of a special rolling stock of the Mytishchi plant Metrovagonmash - two or three-section diesel trains - on the existing infrastructure. Fadeyev rejected Luzhkov's project because it was completely unviable, created a threat to transport security and did not take into account the real influx of passengers. The accumulation of passengers on crowded platforms waiting for a rail bus, Fadeyev warned, is fraught with people falling on the way. After Fadeyev's arguments, it was decided to abandon Luzhkov's project in order to begin a full-scale reconstruction and electrification of the ring in 2011 to launch high-speed passenger traffic on Lastochkas 10 years later.

In March 2001, accompanied by Fadeyev, on the Demikhov train, Putin drove from the Orekhovo-Zuevo station to the Hammer and Sickle platform and positively assessed its quality and economy.

In August 2002, under Fadeyev, the first Aeroexpress in Russia was launched - from Paveletsky railway station to Domodedovo airport, passengers were waiting for a level of comfort and convenience of transporting luggage that had never been seen before on the railway in a specially converted from an ordinary accelerated train.

After the Riga Carriage Works, at that time the monopoly manufacturer of multi-unit rolling stock in the post-Soviet space, increased the price of its electric trains by 3 times in hard currency, the production of Russian electric trains was launched for the first time at the Demikhov Machine-Building Plant; at the same time, Fadeev persuaded the authorities of the consumer regions to make an advance payment against future deliveries. At the Kolomna Diesel Locomotive Plant in December 2003, Fadeyev demonstrated promising brands of high-performance domestic locomotives to Putin.

Minister of Railways (2nd time)

On 4 January 2002, Fadeyev was appointed the Minister of Railways for the second time.

Upon his appointment, the Russian railway industry was in a management crisis, and had a huge tax debt to the federal and regional budgets, as over 300 criminal cases were initiated in the country. Upon taking office, Fadeyev found out that against the backdrop of chronic underfunding of the industry, a number of large private raw materials mining companies in large volumes, with the permission of Minister Aksyonenko, but without a federal government decree, were using budget funds to unplanned, using new materials, the construction of railway approaches to promising coal and iron ore deposits. Fadyeev considered it unacceptable to finance them at the expense of operating costs and profits as non-core facilities, namely: roads and railways to the Elga coal deposit; construction of a new railway from Komsomolsk-on-Amur to Sakhalin Island with a bridge across the Nevelskoy Strait; construction of a transport and logistics center at the Bohumin station in the Czech Republic.

Along with legally unauthorized construction of non-core facilities, Russian railways in 2002 retained significant volumes of construction in progress, the purpose of which was to increase the throughput and carrying capacity of freight-intense directions. The wages of railway workers in Russia were much lower than in industry, as a result of which there was an outflow of highly qualified engineering personnel from the railways. The first cost-effective, deficit-free financial plan, which included state support for unprofitable passenger traffic, was formed under Minister Fadeyev in 2003. Preparations were made, including personnel, to separate the functions of state regulation from the functions of economic activity, which led at the end of 2003 to the creation of the state company Russian Railways, with 100% share capital of the state, headed by Fadeyev. In the same years, Fadeyev, for strategic reasons, predicted the need to build the Northern Latitudinal Railway and the third main route along the entire length of the Trans-Siberian Railway, the construction of which began 15 years later.

President of Russian Railways

On 22 September 2003, Fadeyev became the first president of Russian Railways.

As president during that time, when the first investment program of the government began to operate, work was completed on the Severomuysky tunnel and traffic was opened along the entire length of the BAM; the "remaking" of the narrow gauge to the broad gauge on Sakhalin Island has begun. A significant part of the strategic lines in these years was electrified. The laying of the second track from the Karymskaya station to the Zabaikalskaya station was carried out and the complete electrification of the route to China was carried out; the electrification of the Trans-Siberian Railway was completed, the electrification of the northern route from the Volkhovstroy I station through the whole of Karelia to the Kola Peninsula was accelerated; electrification of the section from Stary Oskol station to Valuyki station was completed. In Saint Petersburg, a new international railway station Ladozhsky was put into operation with a full-fledged track development. Since 2003, the volume of rail transport and its quality have increased significantly.

On 11 April 11 2005 in Hannover, in the presence of President Putin and German Chancellor Gerhard Schröder, Fadeyev and Siemens CEO Hans Schabert signed an agreement on the purchase of 3 ready-made Velaro trains and the joint development and production in Russia of 52 electric trains based on Intercity-Express with maximum speed up to 300 km/h; the amount of this contract was 1.5 billion euros.

It was assumed that the trains would be produced in Russia at a joint venture specially created with the Sinara Group, with the transfer of design and technical documentation to it, with the obligations of the German side to organize the repair of rolling stock in Russia, consulting, staff training and other services. However, 2 months later, after the appointment in June 2005 of Vladimir Yakunin as President of Russian Railways, the configuration of the project was changed by the Board of Directors of Russian Railways: by 2006, the number of ready-made Siemens Velaro trains purchased in Germany was 8, while the contract amount decreased to 750 million euros, including 300 million euros for trains and 300 million euros for their maintenance for 30 years, but the localization of the production of such trains in Russia was no longer envisaged.

Fadeyev considered this transformation of the agreement erroneous, unfavorable for the prospects for the development of the latest high-speed rolling stock in Russia. Fadeyev himself considered the disruption of the original contract with Siemens as one of the main reasons for his unexpected and involuntary resignation from the post of president of Russian Railways, as he resigned on 14 June 2005.

From June 2005 to 2007, he was an assistant to the Prime Minister of Russia, Mikhail Fradkov, and was a member of the Board of Directors of Russian Railways.

After the resignation of the government of Fradkov in 2007, he was removed from the Board of Directors of Russian Railways.

Since 16 September 2015, Fadeyev has been an adviser, on a voluntary basis, to the president of Russian Railways, Oleg Belozyorov.

As a former minister and first president of Russian Railways, and after since 2015 in the status of adviser to the general director of Russian Railways, Fadeyev repeatedly convinced President Putin that the state should retain control of the strategic railway industry, considering it as one of the three pillars of Russian statehood, along with a strong army and powerful energy. According to Fadeyev's concept, the infrastructure of Russian Railways, including railways, bridges, tunnels, energy, automation and telemechanics (SCB) systems, traction, a reasonably necessary part of the car fleet, must remain under state control, in Fadeyev's concept. The participation of business in the Fadeyev's concept was envisaged for non-strategic railway facilities, for example, terminal and logistics centres, car repair enterprises, car fleet and others. In 2016, discussions intensified in the Russian government about the possible partial corporatization of the Russian Railways company, which Fadeyev took as a sign of impending disaster.

In September 2016, Fadeyev criticized the new system that emerged after the railway reform, built on vertically integrated profile directorates and super-centralised administration in Russian Railways, where management at the regional level turned out to be a weak link. As a result of the reform, Fadeyev noted in an interview with the corporate newspaper Gudok, the regional centres of corporate governance (RTsKU) that became the successors of the railways were deprived of the main levers of influence on production processes, began to engage only in coordination and consulting, lost the status of legal entities and the opportunity to participate in economic activities, ceased to manage financial, material and human resources. After the reform, the heads of the railways themselves turned into decorative figures - advisory and coordinating leaders, deprived of real managerial powers. “The directorates of the central level of Russian Railways are not capable of making prompt decisions in connection with the real situation in a particular region. Moscow cannot see everything that happens thousands of kilometers away and take into account the specifics of each road. A situation has arisen where the “tops” do not see all the real problems, and the “bottoms” cannot solve them due to the lack of the necessary resources,” Fadeyev critically said in April 2016 on the pages of the main Russian Railways newspaper.

In December 2016, Fadeyev became the first among transport workers and the 34th in the history of the Russia to receive the Order of Merit for the Fatherland.

In January 2017, when he was awarded the Order of Merit for the Fatherland, I degree, in the Kremlin, Fadeyev again turned to President Putin with an urgent request to keep Russian railways in the hands of the state.

Later events

Between 2019 and 2020, Fadeyev, together with research institutes, is intensively working on solving the aggravated problem of coal export from Kuzbass in the direction of the Eastern landfill, for which Russian Railways, due to the lack of capacity of BAM and the Trans-Siberian Railway, non-transparently coordinates no more than 50% shippers' requests. He is a participant in consultations with federal authorities, a railway holding and cargo owners, an author of analytical materials and proposals for a way out of a crisis situation.

Memoirs

Fadeyev is the author of the memoirs “My Destiny is the Railway”, published in 2007, which reflects the historical events in the industry, which he witnessed and participated in for more than 60 years.

Family and personal life

Fadeyev has been married to his wife, Lyubov Yevgenyevna  Fadeyeva, with a single marriage for over 60 years, since 1960, when they were engaged in the village of Kukhterin Lug, in Amur Oblast.

Lyubov also studied at the departmental school of the Ministry of Railways No. 59, a class older than Gennady; they have known each other since childhood. She graduated from the Pedagogical Institute in Blagoveshchensk with a degree in teaching English and German.

The Fadeyev family has two daughters Irina and Tatyana, three granddaughters, two grandsons and one great-grandson.

Irina (born 1961), is a doctor, and has the following children, Yevgenya, Galina, and Alkesnadr, including their future son, Vasily.

Tatiana (born 1966), is an engineer of communications, and has her following children, Anastasia, and Matvey.

Gennady has been involved in sports since childhood. In the years under 60, he had a new hobby, which was alpine skiing. He regularly rides in ski resorts in the Swiss and Italian Alps, and was in Zermatt in February 2020, at the age of 82. He is also fond of tennis, cycling in the Meshchersky Natural Park and on an exercise bike, as his daily rate is 15–25 km; in his youth he played in the railway football and volleyball teams. He is a theatergoer.

References

1937 births
Living people